Hope is an unincorporated community within Montgomery County, Kentucky, United States.

A post office was established in 1890. According to one source, the town may have been given the name Hope by its first postmaster when, after unsuccessfully submitting several names to the post office, he finally submitted Hope in the 'hope' this time it would be accepted.

References

Unincorporated communities in Montgomery County, Kentucky
Unincorporated communities in Kentucky